On September 28, 2022, the Islamic Revolutionary Guard Corps (IRGC) conducted drone, artillery and missile attacks against Iranian-Kurdish bases in Koya, northern Iraq. Sources reported at least thirteen deaths, including women and children, and 58+ injuries.

The attack was a response to the Democratic Party of Iranian Kurdistan and other Kurdish groups calling for more protests in the Mahsa Amini protests, which Tehran accused of being foreign agents.

Gen. Hasan Hasanzadeh of the Revolutionary Guard said 185 Basijis, a volunteer force, were injured by "machete and knife" in the unrest. Hasanzadeh also said rioters broke the skull of one of the Basij members. He added that five Basijis are hospitalized in intensive care.

Similar attacks continued in the coming days, and casualties have increased to 18 deaths and 62 injuries as of October 4.

Iraq's Foreign Ministry and the Kurdistan Regional Government have condemned the strikes.

References

2022 in Iraqi Kurdistan
2022 crimes in Iraq
September 2022 events in Iraq
October 2022 events in Iraq
Conflicts in 2022
Kurdish rebellions in Iran
Kurdish separatism in Iran
Mahsa Amini protests
Military operations involving Iran
2022 airstrikes